Golf competitions at the 2015 Pan American Games in Toronto was held from July 16 to 19 at the Angus Glen Golf Club in Markham. A total three golf events were held: a singles event for men and women, along with a mixed team event. Golf made its debut at the Pan American Games, after the sport was added to the 2016 Olympics in Rio de Janeiro, Brazil.

Colombia swept all three gold medals.

Venue

The competitions took place at the Angus Glen Golf Club's south course located in the city of Markham, about 35 kilometres from the athletes village. The course had a capacity of 2,000 people.

Competition schedule
The following is the competition schedule for the golf competitions:

Medal table

Medalists

Participating nations
A total of 20 countries had qualified athletes. The number of athletes a nation entered is in parentheses beside the name of the country.

Qualification

A total of 64 athletes (32 men and 32 women) qualified to compete at the games. A nation could enter a maximum of two golfers per gender. As host nation, Canada automatically qualified a full team of four golfers. All other athletes qualified through the Official World Golf Ranking and Women's World Golf Rankings (and if necessary) the World Amateur Golf Ranking as of April 28, 2015 and April 30, 2015, respectively. All nations qualifying in the men's and women's singles events also qualified for the mixed team event.

Brooke Henderson, one of Canada's women entries, withdrew several weeks prior to the Games and was not replaced, leaving 31 women and 63 total competitors.

Of the 32 men entered, five were professionals: Tommy Cocha (Argentina), Adilson da Silva (Brazil), Felipe Aguilar and Mark Tullo (Chile), Marcelo Rozo (Colombia). For the women, six were professionals: Lorie Kane (Canada), Mariajo Uribe and Paola Moreno (Colombia), Margarita Ramos (Mexico), Julieta Granada (Paraguay), Veronica Felibert (Venezuela).

See also
Golf at the 2016 Summer Olympics

References

2015
Events at the 2015 Pan American Games
2015 in golf